The Winfield National Bank Building, located at 901 Main Street in Winfield, Kansas, was built in 1923.  It was listed on the National Register of Historic Places in 2012.

It is Classical Revival in style, with some Beaux-Arts details.

References

Bank buildings on the National Register of Historic Places in Kansas
Buildings and structures completed in 1923
Neoclassical architecture in Kansas
Cowley County, Kansas